Henry County Hospital is a critical access hospital serving Henry County, Ohio, United States.

Facilities

The hospital is equipped with an emergency department, an oncology treatment center, and a helipad for medical evacuation.

U.S. News & World Report had collated the following statistics:

History

It was opened in 1982 to replace the previous S.M. Heller Memorial Hospital, which operated from 1919 to 1982.

In early 2015 Henry County Hospital formed the Vantage Healthcare of Ohio, LLC collaborative with seven other hospitals from Northwest Ohio as a means to pool resources and overall save money.

Accreditation

Henry County Hospital is accredited by DNV-GL Healthcare, and the hospital's laboratory is accredited by The Joint Commission.

References

External links

Hospitals in Ohio
Hospitals established in 1982